The Roland CompuRhythm CR-78 is a drum machine launched in 1978. Although primitive by later standards, the CR-78 represented an important advance in drum machine technology at the time, in particular by allowing users to program and store their own drum patterns. 

The wood effect cabinet and preset rhythms of the CR-78 such as Waltz, Bossa Nova and Rhumba suggest that it was seen by its designers as primarily an accompaniment for an electric organ, but the CR-78 became one of the favorite instruments of pop and electronic musicians in the late 1970s and early 1980s. It was used by artists including Phil Collins, Peter Gabriel, Daryl Hall & John Oates, Blondie, Ultravox, Genesis, John Foxx, Orchestral Manoeuvres in the Dark, Roxy Music, and Gary Numan.

Operation

The CR-78 uses analog drum voices that sound very little like real percussion instruments. The unit also incorporates an NEC microprocessor to provide digital control of its functions.

Previous Roland drum machines had offered only a selection of preset rhythms. The CR-78's key new feature at the time of its introduction was that in addition to offering 34 preset rhythms, it provided four programmable memory locations for storing patterns created by the user. These can be created by using step programming with the WS-1 box, which was available as an optional extra. The four user patterns are stored in RAM memory; when the CR-78 is switched off, the contents of the RAM are maintained by a NiCd rechargeable battery.

The CR-78's front panel allows the user to customize the preset rhythms by altering the volume balance between bass and treble sounds, canceling some sounds altogether, and adding "metallic beat" (three filtered square waves that create a distinctive chime timbre). Many of the preset rhythms have a memorable character, and the ability to manipulate them further made the CR-78 a versatile instrument.

No digital control of tempo is provided on the front panel, with only an analog knob for tempo control. However, the CR-78 accepts an external V-trig clock, allowing a control voltage to be fed in from another device such as a music sequencer.

A selection of preset fills and rhythm variations are also available, either to trigger manually, or automatically every 2, 4, 8 or 16 bars. Some of these fills were used in synth-pop songs such as "Enola Gay" by Orchestral Manoeuvres in the Dark, and "Underpass" by John Foxx.

Roland also produced a simpler drum machine, the CompuRhythm CR-68. This was essentially the same as the CR-78, but without programmable patterns or the ability to fade drum sounds in and out. A large cabinet version, the CompuRhythm CR-800, with capabilities between the CR-68 and CR-78, was also produced. At the same time Roland also sold the TR-66, a smaller unit that offered fewer preset rhythms and no programmability.

Sounds and rhythms 
The CR-78's built-in rhythm sounds were a further development of those available on the earlier Roland Rhythm 33, 55 and 77 machines.

The analog percussion voices consist of bass drum, snare drum, rim shot, hi-hat, cymbal, maracas, claves, cowbell, high bongo, low bongo, low conga, tambourine, guiro, and "metallic beat" (an accent that could be overlaid on the hi-hat voice). The CR-78 also has an accent control that increases the loudness of certain steps in a pattern.

There are four patterns named "Rock" and two named "Disco". Other patterns are named "Waltz", "Shuffle", "Slow Rock", "Swing", "Foxtrot", "Tango", "Boogie", "Enka", "Bossa Nova", "Samba", "Mambo", "Chacha", "Beguine" and "Rhumba". Each pattern is available in two variations, labeled "A" and "B". It is possible to select more than one rhythm at a time, and also mute drum sounds from a pattern using the balance knob and dedicated cancel buttons.

The CR-78 has been used in songs including "In the Air Tonight" by Phil Collins, "I Can't Go for That (No Can Do)" by Daryl Hall & John Oates, "Mad World" by Tears For Fears, and in live performances by Radiohead.

See also
Boss Doctor Rhythm DR-110
Linn LM-1
Roland TR-808

References

External links
 Roland CompuRhythm CR-78 Demo (YouTube video)
 Classic Roland CR-78 eighties tracks part 1: Hall&Oates, Gary Numan, OMD, Soft Cell, Phil Collins (by Harlem Nights Music)
 Classic Roland CR-78 eighties tracks part 2: Blondie, Visage, Roxy Music, John Foxx, Buggles (by Harlem Nights Music)
 Polynominal.com CR78 resources: manual, schematics and audio demo

Drum machines
Japanese inventions
Japanese musical instruments
Products introduced in 1978
CR-78
CR-78
Musical instruments invented in the 1970s